Sword of Kings is the twelfth historical novel in The Saxon Stories series by Bernard Cornwell. It was first published in October 2019.

It is set in 10th-century England and continues to follow the fortunes of the fictional Uhtred of Bebbanburg. This novel begins with his investigating the murder of fishermen under his protection. He then gets drawn into an expected succession struggle in Wessex and Mercia.

Plot summary
A fishing ship from Bebbanburg goes missing. Then the body of one of its crew washes ashore; it is clear the fisherman had been tortured before being killed. Uhtred, Lord of Bebbanburg, goes to sea to investigate, then sets a trap for those responsible. He and his warriors kill or capture the crews of three ships, but the fourth vessel gets away. He learns that Ealdorman Æthelhelm ordered Waormund, a huge, sadistic warrior and one of his most trusted men, to try to kill Uhtred. Waormund tortured the fisherman and was aboard the ship that got away.

Edward, King of Wessex (and son of Alfred the Great), is dying. There are three strong candidates to succeed him: Edward's vicious adult son Ælfweard by his second wife; Æthelstan, Edward's eldest son by his first wife (though many incorrectly believe he is illegitimate); and Edmund, Edward's infant son by Queen Eadgifu of Mercia. Uhtred has raised Æthelstan and trained him to be king, so Æthelhelm had tried to preemptively remove Æthelstan's most effective supporter.

Eadgifu sends a message to Uhtred, begging for his help. Over the objections of his wife and friends, he heads south, accompanied by Finan and a handful of his men. They rescue Eadgifu from Æthelhelm's men and flee. Then Uhtred receives the news that Edward is dead. Edward's will gives Wessex to Ælfweard and Mercia to Æthelstan; Uhtred realises that this will inevitably result in civil war.

Uhtred heads to Lundene (London), which is held by Æthelstan's men. He spots Waormund there, but Waormund gets away. Uhtred becomes concerned when he discovers that Merewalh, the commander of the garrison, has taken most of his men and marched east, having been deceived into believing that an enemy army is approaching. Before Uhtred can do anything, Waormund and his men open one of the city's gates, letting in Æthelhelm's army. The city falls.

Uhtred's party hides, then steals a ship and flees. By bad luck, Waormund sees him and sets out in pursuit with a large force. Eventually, Uhtred is trapped. He gives himself up so his men (as well as women and children he took responsibility for) have a chance to get away. Waormund humiliates him, but does not kill him immediately, as he wants to do so before a much larger audience, in Lundene. Fortunately, some of Merewalh's cavalrymen show up and free Uhtred.

Uhtred persuades Merewalh to give him a portion of his warriors and to agree to his plan to attack Lundene, despite being seriously outnumbered. They have no real choice, as Æthelhelm keeps growing stronger as reinforcements continue arriving. Messengers are sent to fetch Æthelstan's army, which is supposed to be nearby. Uhtred and his men ride boldly into the city, masquerading as some of Æthelhelm's allies. They seize a city gate - Crepelgate - and hold it long enough for Æthelstan to charge through. A sizeable part of Æthelhelm's forces are from East Anglia and have no real stomach for battle; as Uhtred had hoped, they stay out of the fighting, as do many others. Æthelstan wins. Æthelhelm is killed trying to flee. Ælfweard is captured and personally executed by Æthelstan.

Uhtred is told that the plague has broken out in the north; his wife, son-in-law and grandchildren are dead.

References

2019 British novels
The Saxon Stories
Novels set in Northumberland
Novels set in the 10th century
HarperCollins books